The mass media in New Zealand include television stations, radio stations, newspapers, magazines, and websites.  Most outlets are foreign-owned; media conglomerates like NZME, Stuff, MediaWorks, Discovery and Sky dominate the media landscape. Most media organisations operate Auckland-based newsrooms with Parliamentary Press Gallery reporters and international media partners, but most broadcast programmes, music and syndicated columns are imported from the United States and United Kingdom.

The media of New Zealand predominantly use New Zealand English, but Community Access and several local other outlets provide news and entertainment for linguistic minorities. Following a Waitangi Tribunal decision in the 1990s, the Government has accepted a responsibility to promote the Māori language through Te Māngai Pāho funding of the Māori Television Service, the Te Whakaruruhau o Nga Reo Irirangi Māori and other outlets. NZ On Air funds public service programming on the publicly owned Television New Zealand and Radio New Zealand, and on community-owned and privately owned broadcasters.

Censorship

There is limited censorship in New Zealand of political expression, violence or sexual content. Reporters Without Borders rates New Zealand highly for press freedom, ranking it eighth-best worldwide in 2018, up from thirteenth in 2017, and down from fifth in 2016.

The country's libel laws follow the English model, and contempt of court is severely punished. The Office of Film and Literature Classification classifies and sometimes censors films, videos, publications and video games, the New Zealand Press Council deals with print media bias and inaccuracy and the Broadcasting Standards Authority and Advertising Standards Authority considers complaints.

The Department of Internal Affairs is responsible for Internet censorship in New Zealand and runs a voluntary filtering system to prevent Internet users from accessing selected sites and material that contain sexual abuse or exploitation of children and young people. Internet censorship in Australia is more extensive, and New Zealand has refused to follow suit.

Traditional media

Television

Television in New Zealand was introduced in 1960. Initially broadcasting from four separate stations in Auckland, Wellington, Christchurch and Dunedin, television was networked nationwide in 1969. Colour television was introduced in 1973, and a second channel was launched in 1975. Provision was first made for the licensing of private radio and television stations in New Zealand by the Broadcasting Act 1976, although the first private television channel didn't launch until 1989.

Satellite services are provided nationwide by Freeview and Sky, a terrestrial service provided in the main centres by Freeview, and an internet service provided by Vodafone. There are currently 20 national free-to-air channels, 24 regional free-to-air stations and several pay TV networks. Programming and scheduling is done in Auckland where all the major networks are now headquartered.

The first nationwide digital TV service was launched in December 1998 by Sky Network Television, who had a monopoly on digital satellite TV until the launch of Freeview's nationwide digital satellite service in May 2007. The Freeview terrestrial service is a high definition digital terrestrial television service launched on 14 April 2008, initially serving Auckland, Hamilton, Tauranga, Napier-Hastings, Palmerston North, Wellington, Christchurch, and Dunedin. This was later expanded to include more regions. Broadband television is currently operated from Vodafone, The Vodafone service includes all Freeview channels and allows customers to add Sky channel packages to their accounts, through a wholesale deal with Sky. High Definition programming is available from Freeview on terrestrial broadcast only and on Sky.

Radio

New Zealand radio is dominated by twenty-seven networks and station-groups, but also includes several local and low-powered stations. Radio New Zealand operates four public service networks: the flagship Radio New Zealand National, the classical music network Radio New Zealand Concert, the Pacific shortwave service Radio New Zealand International and the Parliamentary broadcasters AM Network.

Two companies have a staunch rivalry in the commercial radio market. NZME Radio operates music station Coast, hip-hop station Flava, rock station Radio Hauraki, 80s and 90s station Mix 98.2, talk network Newstalk ZB, sports network Radio Sport, pop station The Hits and youth station ZM. MediaWorks New Zealand operates sport network LiveSport, dance station George FM, New Zealand music station Kiwi FM, Māori station Mai FM, pop station More FM, talk station Radio Live, oldies station The Sound, easy-listening station The Breeze, youth station The Edge and rock station The Rock.

Rhema Media operates four evangelical Christian networks, most student networks belong to the Student Radio Network and most public access broadcasters belong to the Association of Community Access Broadcasters. The Iwi Radio Network is funded by Te Māngai Pāho and the Pacific Media Network is predominantly funded by NZ On Air.

Print media

The number of newspapers in New Zealand has dramatically reduced since the early 20th century as a consequence of radio, television and new media being introduced to the country. Auckland's The New Zealand Herald serves the upper North Island, Wellington's The Dominion Post serves the lower North Island and Canterbury's The Press and Dunedin's Otago Daily Times serve the South Island.

Provincial and community newspapers, such as the Waikato Times daily, serve particular regions, cities and suburbs. Ownership of New Zealand newspapers is dominated by Stuff and New Zealand Media and Entertainment with Stuff (formerly Fairfax) having 48.6% of the daily newspaper circulation. Local and overseas tabloids and magazines cover food, current affairs, personal affairs, gardening and home decor, and business or appeal to gay, lesbian, ethnic and rural communities.

In early April 2020, German media company Bauer Media Group announced the closure of several of its New Zealand brands including Woman's Day, New Zealand Woman's Weekly, the New Zealand Listener, The Australian Women's Weekly, North & South, Next, Metro, Air New Zealand's inflight magazine Kia Ora, and Your Home & Garden in response to the COVID-19 pandemic in New Zealand.

Literature

Māori in New Zealand had non-literate culture before contact with the Europeans in the early 19th century, but oratory recitation of quasi-historical and hagiographical ancestral blood lines was central to the culture; oral traditions were first published when early 19th century Christian missionaries developed a written form of the Māori language to publish Bibles. The literature of New Zealand includes many works written in English and Māori by New Zealanders and migrants during the 20th and 21st centuries.

Novelists include Patricia Grace, Albert Wendt and Maurice Gee; children's authors include Margaret Mahy. Keri Hulme won the Booker Prize for The Bone People; Witi Ihimaera's novel Whale Rider, which dealt with Māori life in the modern world, ' became a Nikki Caro film.

Migrant writers include South African-born Robin Hyde; expatriate writers like Dan Davin and Katherine Mansfield often wrote about the country. Samuel Butler stayed in New Zealand and set his novel Erewhon in the country. Karl Wolfskehl prepared works of German literature during a sojourn in Auckland. New Zealand's lively community of playwrights, supported by Playmarket, include Roger Hall.

Film

The New Zealand film industry is small but successful, boasting directors such as Peter Jackson and Jane Campion. The cinema of New Zealand includes many films made in New Zealand, made about New Zealand or made by New Zealand-based production companies. Peter Jackson's The Lord of the Rings film trilogy was produced and filmed in New Zealand, and animation and photography for James Cameron's Avatar was primarily done in New Zealand; both films are among the highest-grossing movies of all time. The New Zealand Film Commission funds films with New Zealand content.

Mainstream American, British and Australian films screen in theatres in most cities and towns. Some arthouse films and foreign language films reach cinemas, including weekly Bollywood screenings in many city cinemas. Asian films, particularly from India, China, Hong Kong and Japan, are widely available for rental on videocassette, DVD and similar media, especially in Auckland.

Modern media

Internet

Internet is widely available in New Zealand. There are 1,916,000 broadband connections and just 65,000 dialup connections, with almost every home having an internet connection. Digital subscriber line over phone lines provides two-thirds of broadband, and fibre to the home now covers over a third of the main towns and cities. Parts of Wellington, Kapiti and Christchurch have cable internet access, satellite internet is widely available, most of the country is covered by 3G mobile broadband, and 4G is available in major centres. Broadband pricing is at, or above the OECD average, and most connections have a fixed data cap. There are about 80 ISPs, with two of them having three-quarters of the market. The New Zealand Government is funding two broadband expansion initiatives, with the aim of providing fibre to the home of 75% of the population and bringing broadband to 97.8% of the population by 2019. International connectivity is mainly provided by the Southern Cross Cable.

Internet portals like Google New Zealand, Yahoo New Zealand, NZCity and MSN New Zealand have been popular in New Zealand since the outset of internet access. News websites like Stuff, tvnz.co.nz, rnz.co.nz, nzherald.co.nz, newshub.co.nz, Newsroom, interest.co.nz, thespinoff.co.nz moneyhub.co.nz, odt.co.nz, newstalkzb.co.nz and stoppress.co.nz are increasingly taking over the portal role. Scoop and Voxy publish raw news coverage such as press releases, while skysport.co.nz, radiosport.co.nz and Sportal provide dedicated coverage of sports news. Online magazines such as businessdesk.co.nz, idealog.co.nz, nzbusiness.co.nz and NZ Entrepreneur.co.nz cover business News.

Blogging and social media

New Zealand's blogosphere is dominated by a small community of blogs that comment on New Zealand politics, society and occurrences. One list of over 200 "author-operated, public discourse" blogs in New Zealand (ranked according to traffic, links incoming, posting frequency and comments) suggests New Zealand blogs cover a wide range of ideological positions but a lack of female contributors. Some personal blogs have been around since the mid 1990s, but there are now blogs about cities, science, law and fashion magazines. Political bloggers include current and former party apparatchiks such as David Farrar (Kiwiblog), Jordan Carter, Peter Cresswell and Trevor Loudon, and journalists and commentators such as Russell Brown.

New Zealand politicians and political groups operate blogs which, unlike overseas counterparts, allow comments. Craig Foss operates a personal blog. The Green Party expands on party press releases, and Labour MPs discuss policy and Parliamentary business. Blogging is a central campaigning tool for many political lobbying groups. Political bloggers have been described as potentially the most powerful "opinion makers" in New Zealand politics. There is also an active political and non-political New Zealand community on Twitter, Facebook, Instagram, Tumblr and Flickr.

References

Further reading

External links
Journalism, Media and Democracy Research Centre at Auckland University of Technology

 
New Zealand
New Zealand